The 1973–74 Purdue Boilermakers men's basketball team represented Purdue University during the 1973–74 college basketball season.  They finished the regular season with a record of 17–9 and received an invitation to the 1974 National Invitation Tournament, where they won the championship.

Roster 

Starting Lineup:  F Frank Kendrick, F Jerry Nichols, C John Garrett, G Bruce Parkinson, G Dave Luke.

Schedule and results

|-
!colspan=6 style=|NIT Tournament

Rankings

References

Purdue Boilermakers
Purdue Boilermakers men's basketball seasons